Sex World (stylized as SexWorld) is a 1977 American pornographic science fiction film directed by Anthony Spinelli and written by Spinelli and Dean Rogers, from a story by Spinelli. It stars Annette Haven, Lesllie Bovee, Sharon Thorpe, Desiree West, and Amber Hunt. The film primarily takes place at a fictional resort known as Sex World, where individuals can live out their secret sexual desires and overcome their inhibitions with the help of android sexbots.

Sex World has been described as a spoof or pastiche of the Westworld films, and has been called a porn parody.

Plot
A group of people board a charter bus headed to Sex World, a resort where individuals can stay for three days and nights, and have their sexual fantasies be fulfilled. Among the passengers are a painter named Joan Rice and her husband Jerry; a woman named Millicent and her submissive, impotent partner Ralph; and the lonely and introverted Lisa, who recalls an experience in which she wore a blonde wig and had phone sex with a stranger. The passengers are handed questionnaires and are informed that, in order to guarantee privacy, they are prohibited from fraternizing with each other at the resort.

The bus arrives at Sex World, and that night, the visitors each sit down with individual counselors to be interviewed about their sexual desires. Unbeknownst to the visitors, the discussions are being monitored by a control room of technicians whose jobs are to ensure the fulfillment of their fantasies. In a private room, a white visitor named Roger encounters Jill, a black woman he saw on the bus to Sex World. Despite his racial prejudices, Jill convinces Roger to have sexual intercourse with her. Meanwhile, Jerry finds himself in a room with two girls, Linda and Jo. The girls perform cunnilingus on one another, before both fellating Jerry.

In her interview, Joan describes her attraction to her next-door neighbor Marian. Her desire is then fulfilled in the form of an artificial Marian, who kisses and performs cunnilingus on Joan. Elsewhere, Millicent and Ralph separately speak to their individual counselors. Millicent expresses her wish to be dominated, while Ralph reveals his secret cuckolding fetish. Millicent then engages in rough intercourse with an individual named Phil—who describes himself as being programmed to have stamina—while Ralph watches them through a one-way mirror. Ralph is then led away to another room by Ann, who manages to give him an erection, and the two have sex.

Dale, a woman who wistfully recalls her former lover Alex, is provided with a partner named Tomas. After she lowers her emotional barriers, she and Tomas kiss and have sex. During Lisa's interview, Lisa reveals her desire to be noticed and treated with kindness. She also discloses that she attends X-rated films, and conveys an interest in Johnnie Keyes from Behind the Green Door. Later, she receives a knock on the door of her room from a man who says that he saw her when she arrived, and that he wants to be with her. She denies him entry, and he leaves. An artificial Johnnie Keyes then enters her room. He performs cunnilingus on her, they have intercourse, and she fellates him.

At the end of the weekend, the visitors board the bus to leave Sex World. Joan confides in a counselor that she is worried about her marriage with Jerry. Ralph, now confident and assertive, kisses Millicent and boards the bus with her and the other departing visitors. Meanwhile, Roger attempts to bribe a Sex World employee into allowing him to stay at the resort again, but the employee refuses the offer.

Cast

Marketing and release
In March 1978, Walnut Properties, the company that owned the adult movie theater chain Pussycat Theaters, reportedly won a lawsuit which enabled it to place Pussycat Theaters advertisements in Southern California Rapid Transit District buses to promote the release of Sex World.

Several sources list the film's release year as 1977, including home video distributor Vinegar Syndrome. Other sources, however, list the film's release year as 1978.

Home media
Sex World was released on VHS by at least as early as the 1990s.

In 2014, the film was released on DVD and Blu-ray by Vinegar Syndrome. This release, which features a 4K restoration of the film from its original 35 mm camera negative, was limited to 1,500 units. In 2015, Vinegar Syndrome re-released the film as a standalone DVD, and in 2016, they re-released it on Blu-ray. Vinegar Syndrome released the film on 4K UHD in February 2021.

Notes

References

External links
 
 
 

1970s exploitation films
1970s pornographic films
1977 LGBT-related films
1977 films
American parody films
American pornographic films
American sexploitation films
American LGBT-related films
Android (robot) films
Interracial pornographic films
Lesbian pornographic films
Pornographic parody films
1970s English-language films
1970s American films